Leather with Feather (also known as Urgent Letter) is a 1954 Chinese film directed by Shi Hui and written by the playwright and filmmaker, Zhang Junxiang. A war film that was targeted at children, Letter with Feather focuses on a young boy who, through his wits, delivers an important message to the 8th Route Army while evading Imperial Japanese forces during the Second Sino-Japanese War.

Plot
Haiwa (Cao Yuanyuan) is a twelve-year-old boy and the son of a guerrilla leader. One day, he is entrusted with urgent dispatch that must be brought to the Communist Eighth Route Army, which is fighting the Imperial Japanese Army in northeast China. The letter is marked with three feathers, indicating its importance. He embarks on his mission but must avoid the many Japanese patrols. At one point, he is forced to hide the dispatch under a sheep while posing as a shepherd. Later, he is captured by the Japanese who force him to act as a guide and scout. Using his wits, he leads the Japanese forces into an ambush, where they are killed and he is rescued. Delivering the important letter, the Communist army is able to use the information contained therein to capture a Japanese commander.

Reception
Letter with Feather was extremely popular in China, with its message of patriotism to children. Indeed, it was one of a handful of films made before 1966 that was widely available during the Cultural Revolution.

Abroad, the film was also well received, winning a Best Film Award at the Edinburgh International Film Festival in 1955.

References

External links

1954 films
Chinese drama films
1950s Mandarin-language films
1954 drama films
Second Sino-Japanese War films
Chinese propaganda films
Maoist China propaganda films
Guerrilla warfare in film
1950s war drama films
Chinese war drama films
Chinese black-and-white films